HMS Campbeltown was a Batch 3 Type 22 frigate of the British Royal Navy. Built by Cammell Laird Shipbuilders Ltd. in Birkenhead.  She was part of the third batch of Type 22s, which were larger than their predecessors and incorporated advanced close-in weapons after lessons learnt from the 1982 Falklands War. She was decommissioned on 7 April 2011.

History
In August 2001 she visited Archangel, Russia for the 60th-anniversary of the first WWII Arctic Convoys. In company with Russian warships Zadorniy and Alexander Otrakovski.  On 28 August 2001, as part of the same goodwill visit, Campbeltown laid a wreath in the Barents Sea close to where Russian submarine Kursk was lost on 12 August 2000.

Campbeltowns last deployment was a seven-month tour from 2007 to 2008 in the Persian Gulf, where she operated in support of Operation Calash, a Counter Piracy and counter smuggling operation within the Arabian Sea, Gulf of Aden, and North Indian Ocean and Operation Telic, the security of Iraqi Territorial Seas.  In early 2004 the vessel was deployed as part of NATO's Standing Naval Force Atlantic. HMS Campbeltown entered refit in September 2008.

The ship's bell of the first , a Second World War  famous for her role in the St. Nazaire Raid, was loaned from Campbelltown, Pennsylvania to the current Campbeltown for the duration of her Royal Navy service.

Decommissioning
The Royal Navy announced in March 2011 that Campbeltown would be decommissioned on 7 April 2011. She paid a final visit to her namesake town of Campbeltown, Argyll in March 2011 where a series of ceremonies, including a town centre parade by the ship's crew, took place to commemorate the end of the ship's active service. Campbeltown made her final entrance to Plymouth on 31 March 2011 before decommissioning in a traditional ceremony on 7 April 2011. She was laid up at Portsmouth and in July 2013 sold to Turkish company Leyal for demolition. She was towed from Portsmouth to Turkey on 15 Oct 2013, arrived Aliağa on 29 Oct 2013 and was fully recycled by the 14th March 2014.

The ship's bell has now been returned to Campbelltown, Pennsylvania. The ship's bell made specifically for the next , a Type 31 frigate, was given to Campbeltown, in Argyll and Bute, Scotland and will be displayed in the town's museum until the new ship is commissioned.

Affiliations
Campbeltown was affiliated with a number of military and civic bodies:

J Battery, 3 Regiment, Royal Horse Artillery
No. 24 Squadron RAF
Worshipful Company of Wax Chandlers
Campbeltown, Argyll
Campbelltown, Pennsylvania
Springbank Distillery, Campbeltown, Argyll
Birmingham Nautical Club
TS Campbeltown
Bridgewater Sea Cadet Corps
Royal Marine Cadet Corps, Bradfield College, Reading
CCF Naval Section, Gordon's School, Woking

Footnotes

External links

 Images of HMS Cambeltown @ Seaforces.org

 Recycling report HMS Cambeltown, Chatham & Cumberland at .gov.uk

Ships built on the River Mersey
1987 ships
Type 22 frigates of the Royal Navy